Gavin Hamilton was an early modern Scottish prelate, coadjutor of the Archdiocese of St. Andrews, and Archbishop of St. Andrews.

Gavin was the son of James Hamilton of Raploch. He had been Abbot of Kilwinning. In 1555, he was appointed as the coadjutor, i.e. successor, of Archbishop John Hamilton of St Andrews.  Archbishop John Hamilton died on 7 April 1571; Gavin's name is mentioned in the record of a parliament held at Edinburgh on 13 June, as "Gawan Hamilton, archbishop of St. Andrews". Although there is no record of his formal appointment, the parliament notice appears to tell us that Gavin indeed ruled as bishop for a few months. Gavin died in a skirmish a few days after this parliament.

References
 Dowden, John, The Bishops of Scotland, ed. J. Maitland Thomson, (Glasgow, 1912)

1571 deaths
16th-century Roman Catholic archbishops in Scotland
16th-century births
Archbishops of St Andrews
Scottish abbots
Extraordinary Lords of Session
Scottish bishops 1560–1638